Donn Steven Pall (born January 11, 1962), nickname "The Pope," is an American former professional baseball player who pitched in Major League Baseball (MLB) from 1988 to 1998. Pall graduated from Evergreen Park High School in 1980.  He later pitched for the University of Illinois. While in college he was a member of Phi Sigma Kappa fraternity. Since retirement from pitching he has worked as a Community Relations Representative for the White Sox.

Pall grew up a White Sox fan and saw the team clinch the Western Division title in 1983. He won a championship in 1997 with the Florida Marlins.

References

External links
, or Retrosheet, or Pura Pelota (Venezuelan Winter League)

1962 births
Living people
American expatriate baseball players in Canada
Appleton Foxes players
Birmingham Barons players
Charlotte Knights players
Chicago Cubs players
Chicago White Sox players
Florida Marlins players
Gulf Coast White Sox players
Illinois Fighting Illini baseball players
Indianapolis Indians players
Major League Baseball pitchers
Nashville Sounds players
New York Yankees players
Philadelphia Phillies players
South Bend White Sox players
Tigres de Aragua players
American expatriate baseball players in Venezuela
University of Illinois Urbana-Champaign alumni
Vancouver Canadians players